Blue Creek is a stream in Bollinger County in the U.S. state of Missouri. It is a tributary of Conrad Creek.

Blue Creek was named for the blueish tint of its waters.

See also
List of rivers of Missouri

References

Rivers of Bollinger County, Missouri
Rivers of Missouri